The Division 2 season 1992/1993, organised by the LFP was won by FC Martigues and saw the promotions of FC Martigues, AS Cannes and Angers SCO, whereas 14 teams were relegated to Division 3, as for the 1993/94 season, the division would only have one group.

36 participating teams
Groupe A

 Gazélec Ajaccio
 Olympique Alès
 FC Annecy
 SC Bastia
 AS Cannes
 Olympique Charleville
 US Créteil
 CS Cuiseaux-Louhans
 SAS Épinal
 FC Istres
 FC Martigues
 FC Mulhouse
 AS Nancy
 OGC Nice
 FC Perpignan
 Rodez AF
 CS Sedan
 ASOA Valence

Groupe B

 Amiens SC
 RC Ancenis
 Angers SCO
 AS Beauvais Oise
 FC Bourges
 LB Châteauroux
 USL Dunkerque
 FC Gueugnon
 En Avant Guingamp
 Amicale des Écoles Publiques de Bourg-sous-la-Roche
 Stade Lavallois
 Le Mans UC72
 FC Lorient
 Chamois Niortais FC
 Red Star
 Stade Rennais
 FC Rouen
 Tours FC

League tables

Group A

Group B

Championship play-offs

|}

Promotion play-offs

Top goalscorers

External links and references 
 RSSSF archives of results

Ligue 2 seasons
French
2